The 5"/50 caliber gun (spoken "five-inch-fifty-caliber") was the first long barrel  gun of the United States Navy and was used in the secondary batteries of the early  dreadnought battleships, various protected cruisers, and scout cruisers. They were also refitted in the secondary batteries of the armored cruiser  and the  protected cruisers. They were later used on cargo ships, store ships and unclassified auxiliaries during World War II as well as in emergency coastal defense batteries.

Design
The Mark 5, Nos. 200 – 286, was a 50 caliber naval gun of a simplified construction by combining the breech piece along with the chase hoop into one long tube that was shrunk on from the muzzle. Mod 1 was a Mod 0 gun that was relined with a conical nickel-steel liner and an additional gun-steel chase hoop that extended to the muzzle that was secured by a nickel-steel locking ring. Mod 2, gun No. 280, had a slightly different liner with Mod 3, gun No. 245, was a Mod 0 gun with its gun-steel tube replaced with a nickel-steel tube with a gun-steel chase hoop added that extended all the way to the muzzle. The Mod 3 gun had a longer chase hoop and shorter jacket compare to Mods 1 and 2.

The Mark 6, gun Nos. 293 – 356, was the bag-ammunition equivalent to the Mark 5 gun. Mod 0, Nos. 323 – 356, had a single jacket constructed of nickel-steel, that replaced the jacket, chase hoop and locking ring of the Mark 5. Mod 1, Nos. 293 – 306 and 308, was built of gun-steel with a chamber of a different design with some external differences to fit it onto different mountings. The Mod 2, Nos. 307 and 309 – 322, had the same chamber as the Mod 0 but was otherwise almost identical to the Mod 1.

Naval Service

The 5-inch/50 caliber gun was also used on cargo ships, store ships and unclassified auxiliaries during World War II.

Notes

References

Books
 
Online sources

External links

 Bluejackets Manual, 1917, 4th revision: US Navy 14-inch Mark 1 gun

 

Naval guns of the United States
127 mm artillery